The following is a list of Phalaenopsis species accepted by Plants of the World Online at February 2022:

Newly described species
Several new species have been described recently, which are however not yet evaluated by other institutions.
Phalaenopsis arunachalensis K.Gogoi & Rinya (2020)
Phalaenopsis putaoensis X.H.Jin & H.A.Mung (2021)
Phalaenopsis yarlungzangboensis (2022) 
Phalaenopsis medogensis X.H. Jin & C.B. Ma (2022)

Intergeneric hybrids
The following is a list of intergeneric hybrids recognised by the Royal Horticultural Society that includes species of Phalaenopsis as ancestors, as at February 2022:

 × Aeridopsis (Aerides × Phalaenopsis)
 × Arachnopsis  (Arachnis × Phalaenopsis)
 × Cleisonopsis  (Cleisocentron × Phalaenopsis)
 × Diplonopsis  (Diploprora × Phalaenopsis)
 × Edeara (Arachnis × Phalaenopsis × Renanthera × Vandopsis)
 × Ernestara (Phalaenopsis × Renanthera  × Vandopsis)
 × Eurynopsis  (Eurychone × Phalaenopsis)
 × Laycockara (Arachnis × Phalaenopsis × Vandopsis)
 × Luinopsis (Luisia × Phalaenopsis)
 × Lutherara  (Phalaenopsis × Renanthera  × Rhynchostylis )
 × Macekara (Arachnis × Phalaenopsis × Renanthera  × Vanda × Vandopsis)
 × Moirara (Phalaenopsis × Renanthera  × Vanda)
 × Parnataara (Aerides × Arachnis × Phalaenopsis)
 × Phalaerianda (Aerides × Phalaenopsis × Vanda)
 × Phalandopsis (Phalaenopsis × Vandopsis)
 × Phalphalaenopsis (Phalaenopsis × Paraphalaenopsis)
 × Renanthopsis  (Phalaenopsis × Renanthera )
 × Rhynchonopsis (Phalaenopsis × Rhynchostylis)
 × Sappanara (Arachnis × Phalaenopsis × Renanthera)
 × Sarconopsis (Phalaenopsis × Sarcochilus)
 × Trevorara (Arachnis × Phalaenopsis × Vanda)
 × Trichonopsis  (Phalaenopsis × Trichoglottis)
 × Uptonara (Phalaenopsis × Rhynchostylis  × Sarcochilus)
 × Vandaenopsis (Phalaenopsis × Vanda)
 × Yapara (Phalaenopsis × Rhynchostylis  × Vanda)
 × Yeepengara (Aerides × Phalaenopsis × Rhynchostylis × Vanda)

The following artificial hybrids are listed at Plants of the World Online, although many of the parent genera are now synonyms of other genera, including Vanda, Renanthera and Phalaenopsis:
 × Asconopsis (Ascocentrum × Phalaenopsis)
 × Beardara (Ascocentrum × Doritis × Phalaenopsis)
 × Bogardara (Ascocentrum × Phalaenopsis × Vanda × Vandopsis)
 × Bokchoonara (Arachnis × Ascocentrum × Phalaenopsis × Vanda)
 × Devereuxara (Ascocentrum × Phalaenopsis × Vanda)
 × Doriellaopsis  (Doritis × Kingiella × Phalaenopsis)
 × Doritaenopsis (Doritis × Phalaenopsis)
 × Dresslerara   (Ascoglossum × Phalaenopsis × Renanthera )
 × Hagerara  (Doritis × Phalaenopsis × Vanda)
 × Hausermannara (Doritis × Phalaenopsis × Vandopsis)
 × Himoriara (Ascocentrum × Phalaenopsis × Rhynchostylis × Vanda)
 × Isaoara (Aerangis × Ascocentrum × Phalaenopsis × Vanda)
 × Lichtara (Doritis × Gastrochilus × Phalaenopsis)
 × Meechaiara (Ascocentrum × Doritis × Phalaenopsis × Rhynchostylis × Vanda)
 × Nakagawaara (Aerides × Doritis × Phalaenopsis)
 × Owensara (Doritis × Phalaenopsis × Renanthera)
 × Paulara (Ascocentrum × Doritis × Phalaenopsis × Renanthera  × Vanda)
 × Pepeara (Ascocentrum × Doritis × Phalaenopsis × Renanthera)
 × Phaliella (Kingiella × Phalaenopsis)
 × Pooleara (Ascocentrum × Ascoglossum × Phalaenopsis × Renanthera)
 × Richardmizutaara (Ascocentrum × Phalaenopsis × Vandopsis)
 × Rhyndoropsis (Doritis × Phalaenopsis × Rhynchostylis)
 × Roseara (Doritis × Kingiella × Phalaenopsis × Renanthera)
 × Sidranara (Ascocentrum × Phalaenopsis × Renanthera)
 × Sladeara (Doritis × Phalaenopsis × Sarcochilus)
 × Stamariaara (Ascocentrum × Phalaenopsis × Renanthera × Vanda)
 × Sutingara  (Arachnis × Ascocentrum × Phalaenopsis × Vanda × Vandopsis)
 × Trautara (Doritis × Luisia × Phalaenopsis)
 ×Vandewegheara (Ascocentrum × Doritis × Phalaenopsis × Vanda)

References

Phalaenopsis